Galloping Fury is a lost 1927 American silent Western film directed by B. Reeves Eason and starring Hoot Gibson. It was produced and distributed by Universal Pictures.

Cast
 Hoot Gibson - Billy Halen
 Otis Harlan - Pop Tully
 Sally Rand - Dorothy Shelton
 Frank Beal - Jasper Thornby
 Gilbert Holmes - Pee Wee
 Max Asher - Freckles Watson
 Edward Coxen - James Gordon - Ranch Foreman
 Duke R. Lee - Henchman

References

External links
 
 
 advert,..lobby card

1927 films
Lost American films
Films directed by B. Reeves Eason
Universal Pictures films
1927 Western (genre) films
Lost Western (genre) films
American black-and-white films
1927 lost films
Silent American Western (genre) films
1920s American films